Ardmore is an unincorporated community in Macon County, in the U.S. state of Missouri.

History
Ardmore was platted in the early 1890s as a mining community. A post office called Ardmore was established in 1889, and remained in operation until 1929.

In 1925, Ardmore had 550 inhabitants.

References

Unincorporated communities in Macon County, Missouri
Unincorporated communities in Missouri